The 1937 Campeonato Paulista da Primeira Divisão, organized by the LPF (Liga Paulista de Futebol), was the 36th season of São Paulo's top professional football league. Corinthians won the title for the 9th time. no teams were relegated and the top scorer was Corinthians's Teleco with 15 goals.

System
The championship was disputed in two stages:
First round: It was to be disputed in a single round-robin format, with the six beat teams advancing to the Second round.
Second round: It was to be disputed in a single round-robin format, and the team with the most points in both stages won the title.

Championship

First round

Second round

Final standings

References

Campeonato Paulista seasons
Paulista